Richland Township may refer to:

Arkansas
 Richland Township, Desha County, Arkansas, in Desha County, Arkansas
 Richland Township, Jefferson County, Arkansas, in Jefferson County, Arkansas
 Richland Township, Lee County, Arkansas, in Lee County, Arkansas
 Richland Township, Little River County, Arkansas, in Little River County, Arkansas
 Richland Township, Madison County, Arkansas
 Richland Township, Monroe County, Arkansas, in Monroe County, Arkansas
 Richland Township, Newton County, Arkansas, in Newton County, Arkansas
 Richland Township, Washington County, Arkansas, in Washington County, Arkansas
 Richland Township, Yell County, Arkansas, in Yell County, Arkansas

Illinois
 Richland Township, DeKalb County, Illinois, now Cortland Township
 Richland Township, LaSalle County, Illinois
 Richland Township, Marshall County, Illinois
 Richland Township, Shelby County, Illinois

Indiana
 Richland Township, Benton County, Indiana
 Richland Township, DeKalb County, Indiana
 Richland Township, Fountain County, Indiana
 Richland Township, Fulton County, Indiana
 Richland Township, Grant County, Indiana
 Richland Township, Greene County, Indiana
 Richland Township, Jay County, Indiana
 Richland Township, Madison County, Indiana
 Richland Township, Miami County, Indiana
 Richland Township, Monroe County, Indiana
 Richland Township, Rush County, Indiana
 Richland Township, Steuben County, Indiana
 Richland Township, Whitley County, Indiana

Iowa
 Richland Township, Adair County, Iowa
 Richland Township, Carroll County, Iowa
 Richland Township, Chickasaw County, Iowa
 Richland Township, Decatur County, Iowa
 Richland Township, Delaware County, Iowa
 Richland Township, Dickinson County, Iowa
 Richland Township, Franklin County, Iowa
 Richland Township, Guthrie County, Iowa
 Richland Township, Jackson County, Iowa
 Richland Township, Jasper County, Iowa
 Richland Township, Jones County, Iowa
 Richland Township, Keokuk County, Iowa
 Richland Township, Lyon County, Iowa
 Richland Township, Mahaska County, Iowa
 Richland Township, Sac County, Iowa
 Richland Township, Story County, Iowa
 Richland Township, Tama County, Iowa
 Richland Township, Wapello County, Iowa
 Richland Township, Warren County, Iowa, in Warren County, Iowa

Kansas
 Richland Township, Butler County, Kansas
 Richland Township, Cowley County, Kansas
 Richland Township, Ford County, Kansas
 Richland Township, Hamilton County, Kansas
 Richland Township, Harvey County, Kansas
 Richland Township, Jewell County, Kansas
 Richland Township, Kingman County, Kansas
 Richland Township, Labette County, Kansas, in Labette County, Kansas
 Richland Township, Marshall County, Kansas, in Marshall County, Kansas
 Richland Township, Miami County, Kansas, in Miami County, Kansas
 Richland Township, Ottawa County, Kansas, in Ottawa County, Kansas
 Richland Township, Republic County, Kansas
 Richland Township, Stafford County, Kansas, in Stafford County, Kansas

Michigan
 Richland Township, Kalamazoo County, Michigan
 Richland Township, Missaukee County, Michigan
 Richland Township, Montcalm County, Michigan
 Richland Township, Ogemaw County, Michigan
 Richland Township, Saginaw County, Michigan

Minnesota
 Richland Township, Rice County, Minnesota

Missouri
 Richland Township, Barton County, Missouri
 Richland Township, Douglas County, Missouri, in Douglas County, Missouri
 Richland Township, Gasconade County, Missouri
 Richland Township, Macon County, Missouri, in Macon County, Missouri
 Richland Township, Morgan County, Missouri
 Richland Township, Ozark County, Missouri
 Richland Township, Putnam County, Missouri, in Putnam County, Missouri
 Richland Township, Scott County, Missouri
 Richland Township, Stoddard County, Missouri
 Richland Township, Vernon County, Missouri

Nebraska
 Richland Township, Saunders County, Nebraska

North Carolina
 Richland Township, Beaufort County, North Carolina, in Beaufort County, North Carolina
 Richland Township, Randolph County, North Carolina, in Randolph County, North Carolina

North Dakota
 Richland Township, Burke County, North Dakota, in Burke County, North Dakota

Ohio
 Richland Township, Allen County, Ohio 
 Richland Township, Belmont County, Ohio 
 Richland Township, Clinton County, Ohio 
 Richland Township, Darke County, Ohio 
 Richland Township, Defiance County, Ohio 
 Richland Township, Fairfield County, Ohio 
 Richland Township, Guernsey County, Ohio 
 Richland Township, Holmes County, Ohio 
 Richland Township, Logan County, Ohio 
 Richland Township, Marion County, Ohio 
 Richland Township, Vinton County, Ohio 
 Richland Township, Wyandot County, Ohio

Pennsylvania
 Richland Township, Allegheny County, Pennsylvania
 Richland Township, Bucks County, Pennsylvania
 Richland Township, Cambria County, Pennsylvania
 Richland Township, Clarion County, Pennsylvania
 Richland Township, Venango County, Pennsylvania

South Dakota
 Richland Township, Beadle County, South Dakota, in Beadle County, South Dakota

Township name disambiguation pages